Aubechies is a village of Wallonia and a district of the municipality of Belœil, located in the province of Hainaut, Belgium.

Aubechies is a member of the Les Plus Beaux Villages de Wallonie ("The Most Beautiful Villages of Wallonia") association. The Archeosite and Museum of Aubechies is located in Aubechies. A museum dedicated to the period of history from pre-history until Roman times, it is the largest archaeological open-air museum in Belgium. The village has a Romanesque village church dedicated to Saint Géry, a town hall and a school. It is a typical example of Wallonian villages in this area.

References

External links

Former municipalities of Hainaut (province)